Corrido (Comasco:   or  )is a comune (municipality) in the Province of Como in the Italian region Lombardy, located about  north of Milan and about  north of Como. As of 31 December 2004, it had a population of 762 and an area of 6.3 km².

Corrido borders the following municipalities: Carlazzo, Porlezza, Val Rezzo.

Demographic evolution

References

Cities and towns in Lombardy